Tjilik Riwut Airport , formerly Panarung Airport, is an airport in Palangkaraya, Central Kalimantan, Indonesia. This airport is named after Tjilik Riwut (1918–1987), the second Governor of Central Kalimantan. The airport served about 1 million passengers in 2018.

History 
Tjilik Riwut Airport formerly Panarung Airport, opened
on 1 May 1958 the inauguration was carried out by the governor of Central Kalimantan, Tjilik Riwut. At that time it can be used and landed by a Twin Otter aircraft (from the Indonesian Air Force).

On 24 September 1973 Panarung Airport by the Regional Government of
Central Kalimantan was handed over to the Directorate General of Civil Aviation at the Department Transportation of Indonesia. Since then the responsibility of the Central Kalimantan Regional Government has shifted completely
to the central government, as a follow up to the handover by the Minister of Transportation
Mr. Prof. Dr. Emil Salim declared Panarung Palangka Raya Airport as a domestic airport using a Fokker 27 aircraft.
 
Panarung Airport becomes Tjilik Riwut Airport
Coinciding with the commemoration of National Heroes' Day on 10 November 1988 the name of Tjilik Riwut (former Governor of Central Kalimantan), enshrined for the airport name (previously named Panarung Airport).
The name change to Tjilik Riwut Airport and the signing of the inscription was carried out by the Minister of Transportation Republic of Indonesia Ir. Azwar Anas. The name change is in accordance with the proposal of the Governor of Central Kalimantan, and recommendations / responses of Minister of the Interior.
The prescription of the name is because Tjilik Riwut is a National Hero (Dekrit Presiden Republik Indonesia tanggal 6 November 1988, No.108 / TK / 1988).

On 28 March 2019 the airport's new terminal began operations, all flight activities at the airport's old terminal were moved to the new airport terminal.

Then on 8 April 2019 the new terminal of Tjilik Riwut Airport was inaugurated by President of the Republic of Indonesia Joko Widodo.

Terminal facilities

The capacity of the airport has increased after the new terminal was officially inaugurated on 28 March 2019. The total terminal capacity at that time was 15,000 square meters, able to serve 1,000 passengers daily. The terminal was extended further with an area of 29,124 square meters; the double level terminal can now serve 2,200 passengers daily.

There are a few shops and restaurants in the terminal to serve the passengers. The airport has its own taxi service for arrival passengers; alternative local taxi and transport companies such as Grab, GoJek and small local buses (angkot) are not permitted to collect passengers from the airport.

Airlines and destinations

Passenger

Accidents and incidents 
 29 August 2011: Garuda Indonesia Boeing 737-500 flight GA551 carrying 96 passengers to Jakarta had to return to Palangkaraya after being airborne for about 10 minutes due to air disruption in the aircraft cabin. This technical problem was only discovered when the aircraft had taken off from Palangkaraya at 08.04 local time.
 30 September 2011: Garuda Indonesia Boeing 737-500 from Jakarta had to divert to Banjarmasin after failing to land in Palangkaraya due to thick smog.
 22 April 2012: Garuda Indonesia Boeing 737-800 flight GA550 from Jakarta struck an eagle on approach to Palangkaraya. While there were no fatalities from this incident, the nose cone of the aircraft was damaged. The aircraft was unable to perform the return flight to Jakarta and passengers of the return flight departed at 20:00 local time by using a replacement aircraft from Jakarta.
 22 September 2012: Lion Air Boeing 737-900ER that was chartered by one of the Central Kalimantan contingents of PON XVIII failed to land at Palangkaraya at 00.15 local time. After a first failed attempt, the aircraft circled for approximately 45 minutes before successfully landing at the airport. This incident happened due to the flight crew's lack of experience in landing in Palangkaraya.

References

External links
Tjilik Riwut Airport - Indonesia Airport Global Website
 

Palangka Raya
Airports in Central Kalimantan